The 2020 Alaska Senate elections took place as part of the biennial 2020 United States elections. Voters in Alaska elected state senators in 11 of the state's 20 senate districts – the usual ten plus one special election. State senators serve four-year terms in the Alaska Senate, with half seats up for election every two years. Primary elections on August 18, 2020, determined which candidates appeared on the general election ballot on November 3, 2020.

Following the previous election in 2018, Republicans had control of the Alaska Senate with 13 seats to Democrats' 7 seats. One Democrat caucused with the Republicans, giving them a governing majority of 14 seats.

Composition

Predictions

Overview

Close races

Incumbents defeated

In primary
Two Republican incumbents lost renomination.
N District: Senate President Cathy Giessel lost renomination to Roger Holland.
B District: John Coghill lost renomination to Robert Myers Jr.

Summary of results

Detailed results

District B
Republican primary
John Coghill, the incumbent since 2009, was facing opposition in the Republican primary from Robert Myers Jr., who announced his candidacy for the seat on July 10. Trailing by 14 votes in the official count, incumbent Coghill asked for a recount, but, when the lead remained the same after the recount, Coghill conceded defeat and Myers was declared the winner.

General election

District D
David S. Wilson, the incumbent since 2017, was facing opposition in the Republican primary from five other candidates. Thomas Lamb, who filed as a nonpartisan on the Democratic primary ticket, qualified automatically for the general election.
Republican primary

General election

District F
Republican Shelley Hughes, the incumbent since 2017, and Independent Stephany Jeffers were the only two candidates to file for this seat. They both advanced unopposed to the general election. Jeffers withdrew her candidacy on August 31 and was replaced by fellow Independent Jim Cooper.

District H
Democrat Bill Wielechowski, the incumbent since 2007, and Republican Madeline Gaiser were the only two candidates to file for this seat. They both advanced unopposed to the general election.

District J
Democrat Tom Begich, the incumbent since 2017, was the only candidate to file for this seat. He ran unopposed in the general election.

District L
Republican primary
Natasha von Imhof, the incumbent since 2016, was facing opposition in the Republican primary from challenger Stephen Duplantis. Roselynn Cacy, the only Democrat to file, qualified automatically for the general election. Independent candidate Jeff Landfield withdrew his candidacy on August 31. Republican primary loser Stephen Duplantis announced intentions to register as a write-in candidate.

General election

District M (special)
After the death of Sen. Chris Birch in August 2019, Governor Mike Dunleavy appointed state representative Josh Revak to the Senate the following month. Revak was running as the incumbent and was seeking his first full term. He was challenged by two candidates in the Republican primary. In addition, two candidates were contesting the Democratic primary.

Democratic nominee Anita Thorne withdrew her candidacy on August 31.
Republican primary

Democratic primary

General election

District N
Cathy Giessel, the incumbent since 2011 and the President of the Senate since January 2019, was facing opposition in the Republican primary from DOT&PF measurement scientist Roger Holland. Additionally, two candidates were contesting the Democratic primary.
Republican primary

Democratic primary

General election

District P
Gary Stevens, the incumbent since 2003, was facing opposition in the Republican primary from former state house candidate John Cox. Challenger Greg Madden contested the general election on the Alaskan Independence Party ticket.
Republican primary

General election

District R
Republican primary
Bert Stedman, the incumbent since 2003, was facing opposition in the Republican primary from handyman Michael Sheldon.

General election

District T
Donny Olson, the incumbent since 2001, was running unopposed in the Democratic primary. Two Republican candidates, Kotzebue vice-mayor Thomas Baker and Deering tribal president Calvin Moto II, have filed to challenge him for the seat.
Republican primary

General election

See also
 Alaska Senate
 2020 Alaska House of Representatives election
 2020 Alaska elections
 2020 United States elections

Notes

References

External links
 
 
  (state affiliate of the U.S. League of Women Voters)
 

senate
2020
Alaska Senate